The 1999 season was the Kansas City Chiefs' 40th in the National Football League (NFL) and their 30th overall. The season began with the promotion of defensive coordinator Gunther Cunningham to head coach following the resignation of Marty Schottenheimer after the Chiefs finished with a 7–9 record in 1998.

The team improved on that in 1999, finishing with a 9–7 record, which was good enough for second place in the AFC West. However, the Chiefs were denied the division title and a playoff berth in the final game of the season against the Oakland Raiders, when Raiders kicker Joe Nedney kicked a field goal in overtime. This game also was the final game future Hall of Fame linebacker Derrick Thomas played in before his death on February 8, 2000.

Offseason

NFL draft

Personnel

Staff

Roster

Schedule

Preseason

Regular season

Note: Intra-division opponents are in bold text.

Game summaries

Week 1: at Chicago Bears

Week 2: vs. Denver Broncos

Week 3: vs. Detroit Lions

Week 4: at San Diego Chargers

Week 5: vs. New England Patriots

Week 7: at Baltimore Ravens

Week 8: vs. San Diego Chargers

Week 9: at Indianapolis Colts

Week 10: at Tampa Bay Buccaneers

Week 11: vs. Seattle Seahawks

Week 12: at Oakland Raiders

Week 13: at Denver Broncos

Week 14: vs. Minnesota Vikings

Week 15: vs. Pittsburgh Steelers

Week 16: at Seattle Seahawks

Week 17: vs. Oakland Raiders

Standings

References

Kansas City Chiefs
Kansas City Chiefs seasons
Kansas